The Federation of the Swiss Watch Industry (FH) is the Swiss watch industry's leading trade association, headquartered in Bienne, Switzerland. The Federation is a private, professional and non-profit association.

The Federation of the Swiss Watch Industry was established on 19 November 1982 as the result of the merger of the Swiss Federation of Watch Manufacturers’ Associations (founded in 1876) and the Swiss Chamber of Watchmaking (founded in 1924). It currently gathers more than 500 members representing more than 90% of all Swiss watch manufacturers (watches, clocks, movements, components, etc.).

History 
On 14 May 1876, the Intercantonal Association of Jura Industries was founded in Switzerland.  In 1900, it became the Swiss Chamber of Watchmaking and Allied Industries, extending the focus to include jewellery, gold & silver work, and music boxes. The Swiss Federation of Clock and Watch Manufacturers’ Associations (FH) was established in 1924 by delegates from Bern, Biel/Bienne, Fleurier, Geneva, La Chaux-de-Fonds, Le Locle, Porrentruy, Tramelan, and German-speaking Switzerland. On November 19, 1982, the two organizations merged to become the Federation of the Swiss Watch Industry (FH).  The headquarters were in Biel/Bienne.

Functions 
On one hand, the FH provides its members with a large series of services in the fields of legal, economic and commercial issues, representing the sector as a whole, both in Switzerland and abroad. On the other hand, it acts as a privileged counterparts for the authorities, the media and the public in general, coordinating policy-making within the industry.

See also
 Watchmaker
 Chronometer watch
 Clockmaker
 Counterfeit watch

References

Publications
 Illustrated Professional Dictionary of Horology

External links 
 Federation of the Swiss Watch Industry FH

Watch Industry
Swiss Watch Industry
Business organisations based in Switzerland
Organizations established in the 1930s